Basketball at the 2015 Southeast Asian Games was held from 9 to 15 June 2015 in Kallang, Singapore. This edition featured both tournaments for men's and women's team. All matches were held in OCBC Arena Hall 1.

Participating nations
A total of 178 athletes from nine nations competed in basketball at the 2015 Southeast Asian Games:

 
 
 
 
 
 
 
 
 

This is based on the assumption that every team has 12 players on their roster.

Squads

Competition schedule
The following is the competition schedule for the basketball competitions:

Medalists

Medal table

Results

Men

Teams

Final standing

Women

Teams

Final standing

References

External links
  

 
Kallang